Chevreulia lycopodioides, the clubmoss cudweed, is a species of flowering plant in the family Asteraceae. It is found only in Falkland Islands. Its natural habitats are temperate shrubland and temperate grassland.

References

Flora of the Falkland Islands
Least concern plants
Taxonomy articles created by Polbot